Broadmeadows Bus Service is a bus and coach operator in Melbourne, Australia. It operates eight routes under contract to Public Transport Victoria. It is owned by Northern Transit Holdings, which also operates Kastoria Bus Lines, Nationwide Tours and Seymour Bus Lines.

History
Broadmeadows Bus Service was formed in 1947 when J Loughnan purchased a service between Broadmeadows and North Coburg Tram Terminus from P Thorne. In the early 1950 coach charter operations commenced. In 1974 services were extended to Campbellfield and in 1985 from Upfield and North Coburg to Craigieburn. In 1990, it commenced operating coach services under contract to V/Line from Melbourne to Mildura.

In July 2007, the Wright family, proprietors of Moreland Buslines, acquired a 50% share of Broadmeadows Bus Service. Both the Loughnan and Wright families sold out to Dom Sita of Kastoria Bus Lines in 2011. Broadmeadows Bus Service has since been reorganised under Northern Transit Holdings, along with other Dominic Sita's bus businesses, including Kastoria Bus Lines.

The Western Autistic School uses Broadmeadows-owned buses for student transport.

Fleet
As of November 2022, the fleet consisted of 48 buses and coaches. The fleet livery is white with a dark brown stripe.

References

External links

Company website
Showbus gallery

Bus companies of Victoria (Australia)
Bus transport in Melbourne
Transport companies established in 1947
1947 establishments in Australia